The Purchase on the Muskingum also called Ohio Company's Second Purchase, was a tract of land in the Northwest Territory, later Ohio, that the Ohio Company of Associates purchased from the United States federal government in 1792.

History

In 1787 the Ohio Company of Associates contracted to buy  of land in southern Ohio for one million dollars. The community of Marietta, Ohio was established in 1788.

Second Purchase
The United States granted veterans of the Revolutionary war land bounties for their service because money to pay them was short. The bounty depended upon rank. These lands were to the north and northwest of the First Purchase in portions of Morgan, Hocking, Vinton and Athens Counties. The Second Purchase was surveyed on the plan of the Land Ordinance of 1785. The Second Purchase had no sections set aside for schools or ministry.

See also
Ohio Lands
Historic regions of the United States
Ohio Company of Associates

References

Bibliography

External links
 Manuscripts and Documents of the Ohio Company of Associates - Marietta College.
 Ohio Company of Associates - Ohio History Central.

Pre-statehood history of Ohio
Marietta, Ohio